Shivrajpur beach, near Shivrajpur village, is located in the Devbhoomi Dwarka district of Gujarat, India. The latitude of Shivrajpur beach is 22.3329°N and the longitude is 68.9537° E. The Shivrajpur village was formed by Baroda state during the early 19th century. It was awarded the prestigious ‘Blue Flag' beach certification in October 2020 by the Denmark based international agency known as the Foundation for Environment Education; which is a Denmark-based voluntary organization. It is a white sand beach with azure clear water.

There are 33 stringent criteria to be met to receive ‘Blue Flag’ certification including seawater quality and conservation and the safety of tourists along with other criteria that need to be consistently met. The beach runs on solar power and is disabled-friendly.

The water is shallow and is a suitable beach for swimming. The beach is accessible through air, train and by road. The beach timings are from 8 am to 7 pm, has a nominal entry fee and the best time to visit the beach is from October to April.

There is a lighthouse near the beach named Kacchighadh Lighthouse. It is believed that the ruler of Kachchh or katuch, Maharao Deshalji, constructed a small fort with an 11-meter high black masonry unlit beacon. The purpose of the fort was to provide safety and shelter to the Kachchhi vessels. Here, facilities like emergency repairs of boats, ration and drinking water were also provided. A battery-operated flashing light was placed at the top of the cabin in 1977 which was the first light in the region. The earthquake on January 26, 2001, left the lighthouse damaged but it was restored immediately.

Tourism 
Tourism at the beach is gradually picking up. After the declaration of ‘Blue Flag’ beach, the Government of Gujarat has decided to spend money behind its beautification. The government will spend Rs 100 crore (approx 13 million US dollar) to develop Shivrajpur beach in two phases.

Gujarat Chief Minister Vijay Rupani laid the foundation stone and the groundbreaking ceremony for tourist-centric projects was held in January 2021.

In the first phase, a bicycle track, pathway, parking area, drinking water facility, toilet blocks, arrival plaza and tourist facility centre will be developed at the cost of Rs 20 crore. Under phase-2, further facilities will be added to make it an international level beach. Vijay Rupani was quoted saying, ‘Shivrajpur beach will have better facilities than Goa’.

Activities at Shivrajpur beach 
The activities carried out at the beach include Scuba Diving, Snorkelling, Boating and Island tour. 

Some notable attractions near Shivrajpur beach include: Dwarkadhish Temple, Bet Dwarka, Nageshwar Jyotirlinga, Rukmini Devi temple and Sunset point Dwarka.

References 

Beaches of Gujarat
Devbhoomi Dwarka district
Blue Flag beaches